Namami Brahmaputra is an international festival that celebrates the beauty of the Brahmaputra river. It is organised by Assam Government. It was the first international river festival to be held in Assam. The first edition was celebrated from 31 March-4 April 2017. The then President of India, Shri Pranab Mukherjee, inaugurated the ‘Namami Brahmaputra’ festival.

The five day programme hosted activities to showcase Assam’s art, heritage and culture. The event was held in 21 districts across the state touched by the Brahmaputra.

References

Gallery

External links
 Namami Brahmaputra Official Website

Festivals in Assam
Brahmaputra River